Dmitri Kruglov (born 24 May 1984) is an Estonian retired professional footballer who played as a left-back and a winger. He made 115 appearances for the Estonia national team scoring 4 goals.

He was known for his powerful shooting and often took free kicks and penalties.

Club career

Early career
Kruglov came through the youth system at TJK.

Levadia
In 2003, Kruglov joined Meistriliiga club Levadia. He won his first Meistriliiga title in the 2004 season.

Lokomotiv Moscow
On 8 June 2005, Kruglov signed a five-year contract with Russian Premier League club Lokomotiv Moscow after a training stint with English club Sunderland.  He made his debut in the Russian Premier League on 3 July 2005, in a 4–0 home victory over Terek Grozny.

In July 2006, Kruglov joined Russian First Division club Kuban Krasnodar on loan until the end of the season, making just one appearance in the Russian Cup. In July 2007, Kruglov went out on loan again, this time to Torpedo Moscow.

Neftçi Baku
On 29 February 2008, Kruglov joined Azerbaijan Premier League club Neftçi Baku on a three-month loan, after which he signed permanently.

Inter Baku
On 7 July 2010, Kruglov signed a one-year contract with Azerbaijan Premier League club Inter Baku. His contract was not renewed after the 2010–11 season.

Rostov
On 2 August 2011, Kruglov signed three-year contract with Russian Premier League side Rostov. He scored his first goal in the Russian Premier League on 18 September 2011, in a 1–1 home draw against CSKA Moscow.

Return to Levadia
On 31 July 2013, Kruglov returned to Estonia and rejoined Levadia. He won his second Meistriliiga title in the 2013 season.

Ravan Baku
On 7 March 2014, Kruglov signed a contract with Azerbaijani club Ravan Baku. On 20 April 2014, in a match against Gabala, Kruglov suffered a season-ending shoulder injury that required surgery. He left the club after the season.

Second return to Levadia
On 20 June 2014, Kruglov once again rejoined Levadia until the end of the season. He won his third Meistriliiga title in the 2014 season. On 5 March 2015, Kruglov signed a one-year contract extension that tied him to Levadia until the end of the 2015 season.

FCI Tallinn
On 14 December 2015, Kruglov signed a two-year contract with Meistriliiga club Infonet. He won his fourth Meistriliiga title in the 2016 season.

FCI Levadia
After the 2017 season, FCI Tallinn and Levadia merged their first teams, becoming FCI Levadia. On 4 January 2018, Kruglov signed a new one-year contract with FCI Levadia, with the option to extend the contract for another year.
Released from club on 12 january 2021.

International career
Kruglov began his youth career in 2002 with the Estonia under-19 team. He also represented the under-20 and under-21 national sides.

Kruglov made his senior international debut for Estonia on 13 October 2004, in a 2–2 draw against Latvia in a qualification match for the 2006 FIFA World Cup. He scored his first international goal from a penalty kick on 12 November 2005, in a 2–2 draw against Finland in a friendly. In 2011, Kruglov was the only player to appear in all 13 matches Estonia played that year. On 29 May 2016, he made his 100th appearance for Estonia, in a 0–2 away loss to Lithuania at the 2016 Baltic Cup.

Career statistics

Club

International

Scores and results list Estonia's goal tally first, score column indicates score after each Kruglov goal.

Honours
FCI Levadia
Meistriliiga: 2004, 2013, 2014
Estonian Cup: 2003–04, 2004–05, 2017–18
Estonian Supercup: 2018

Inter Baku
Commonwealth Cup: 2011

FCI Tallinn
Meistriliiga: 2016
Estonian Cup: 2016–17
Estonian Supercup: 2017

See also
 List of footballers with 100 or more caps

References

External links

1984 births
Living people
People from Tapa, Estonia
Estonian people of Russian descent
Estonian footballers
Association football defenders
Association football midfielders
Esiliiga players
Meistriliiga players
FCI Levadia Tallinn players
FCI Tallinn players
Russian Premier League players
FC Lokomotiv Moscow players
FC Kuban Krasnodar players
FC Torpedo Moscow players
FC Rostov players
Azerbaijan Premier League players
Shamakhi FK players
Ravan Baku FC players
Estonia youth international footballers
Estonia under-21 international footballers
Estonia international footballers
FIFA Century Club
Estonian expatriate footballers
Estonian expatriate sportspeople in Russia
Expatriate footballers in Russia
Estonian expatriate sportspeople in Azerbaijan
Expatriate footballers in Azerbaijan
Neftçi PFK players
Maardu Linnameeskond players